Aziz Ahmed Jatoi is a Pakistani politician who had been a Member of the Provincial Assembly of Sindh, from 2002 to May 2018.

Early life and education
He was born on 1 November 1964 in Mehrabpur.

He has a degree of Master of Arts in Political Science and a degree of Bachelor of Arts (Hons) from the University of Karachi.

Political career

He was elected to the Provincial Assembly of Sindh as a candidate of Pakistan Peoples Party (PPP) from Constituency PS-41 (Larkana-VII) in 2002 Pakistani general election. He received 21,852 votes and defeated Allah Bux Khan, a candidate of Pakistan Muslim League (Q) (PML-Q). In the same election, he ran for the seat of the Provincial Assembly of Sindh as an independent candidate from Constituency PS-42 (Larkana-VII) but was unsuccessful. He received 24 votes and lost the seat to Najamuddin Abro, a candidate of PPP.

He was re-elected to the Provincial Assembly of Sindh as a candidate of PPP from Constituency PS-41 (Larkana-Cum-Kamber Shahdadkot-II) in 2008 Pakistani general election. He received 37,661 votes and defeated Abdul Ghaffar Brohi, a candidate of PML-Q.

He was re-elected to the Provincial Assembly of Sindh as a candidate of PPP from Constituency PS-41 (Larkana-Cum-Kamber Shahdadkot-II) in 2013 Pakistani general election. He received 19,663 votes and defeated an independent candidate, Aadil Altaf Unar.

References

Living people
Sindh MPAs 2013–2018
1964 births
Pakistan People's Party politicians
Sindh MPAs 2002–2007
Sindh MPAs 2008–2013